Simone Iannarelli is a composer and classical guitarist born in Rome, Italy, in 1970.

He is professor of guitar in Mexico, at the University of Colima's Faculty of Fine Arts Music Department. His works are published by Guitar Solo Publications and other publishers.

References

External links 
Official Homepage

Italian classical guitarists
Italian male guitarists
20th-century classical composers
21st-century classical composers
Italian classical composers
Italian male classical composers
1970 births
Living people
20th-century Italian composers
20th-century guitarists
21st-century guitarists
20th-century Italian male musicians
21st-century Italian male musicians